Migori Airport  is an airstrip in Migori, Kenya.

References
 Kenya Airports Authority
 Kenya Civil Aviation Authority
 List of airports in Kenya

External links
 Details of Some of Kenya's Airport Runways
  Website of Kenya Airports Authority
 List of Airports In Kenya
  Airkenya Routes

Airports in Kenya
Migori County